The 6th Vuelta a España (Tour of Spain), a long-distance bicycle stage race and one of the three grand tours, was held from 7 to 30 May 1946. Emilio Rodríguez won the mountains classification.

After the 22nd stage, Jan Lambrichs was in second place. The Dutch team then received a letter, saying that Lambrichs should give up his second place, otherwise he would reach the finish in Madrid in an ambulance. The team manager decided not to tell Lambrichs about this threat, but gave him extra security. In the final stage, Berrendero escaped and left everybody behind, including Lambrichs, and took over the second place. The next day, the Dutch team received a box of Cuban cigars from the unknown person who had sent the threat.

Teams and riders

Route

Results

Final General Classification

References

 
1946
1946 in Spanish sport
1946 in road cycling